AGH-192 is a potent and selective, water soluble, orally bioavailable and brain penetrant full agonist at the 5HT7 serotonin receptor, derived from the older drug AGH-107. In animal tests it showed activity indicative of potential application in the treatment of neuropathic pain.

See also 
 AGH-107
 AH-494

References 

Serotonin receptor agonists
Indoles
Iodoarenes
Imidazoles